Secret Menace is a 1931 American Western film written and directed by Richard C. Kahn. The film stars Glenn Tryon, Virginia Brown Faire, and Arthur Stone.

Cast list
Glenn Tryon
Virginia Brown Faire
Arthur Stone
Margaret Mann
Ed Cecil
John Elliott
Jules Cowles
Pat Harmon
Joe Savage
Charles Balda
Vera McGinnis

References

1931 films
1931 Western (genre) films
American Western (genre) films
Films directed by Richard C. Kahn
1930s American films